Charles Meredyth may refer to:
 Charles Meredyth (died 1700), Irish MP and Chancellor of the Exchequer of Ireland
Charles Meredyth (died 1710), Irish MP for county Meath and Kells
Charles Meredyth (priest) (died 1747), Dean of Ardfert

See also
Charles Meredith (disambiguation)